The siege of Fort Henry was an attack on American militiamen during the American Revolutionary War near the Virginia outpost known as Fort Henry by a mixed band of Indians in September 1777.  The fort, named for Virginia Governor Patrick Henry,  was at first defended by only a small number of militia, as rumors of the Indian attack had moved faster than the Indians, and a number of militia companies had left the fort.  The American settlers were successful in repulsing the Indian attack.

Background

In the summer of 1777, rumors began circulating throughout frontier areas of Virginia and Pennsylvania that Indians living in the Ohio Country were planning attacks on frontier settlements on and around the Ohio River.  Fort Henry, which had been constructed in 1774 to protect the settlers in the area around what is now Wheeling, West Virginia, was one of the rumored targets. 

In early August, General Edward Hand, the commander at nearby Fort Pitt warned Lieutenant David Shepherd and all of the local militia captains of the threat, ordering them to gather at Fort Henry.  For a time thereafter, militia companies stayed at Fort Henry, improving its defenses and patrolling for Indians. However, the absence of any obvious threat led many of those companies to leave and return to their homes. By the end of August, only two companies, those of Captains Joseph Ogle and Samuel Mason, remained.

Prelude

The battle is reported in some sources to have taken place on September 1, and in others on September 21. On the night of the battle, a mixed band of about 200 Indians (predominantly Wyandot and Mingo, although there were also some Shawnee and Delaware) under the leadership of the Wendat chief Pomoacan, approached the fort in great stealth and secrecy.
Local men later joined by recruits from Fort Shepherd (in Elm Grove) and Fort Holliday defended the fort.

Battle and aftermath

When four men left the fort early that morning, the Indians attacked them, killing one.  The other three escaped, including two who returned to the fort to raise the alarm. Anticipating a sortie from the fort, the Indians set up an ambush.  The party that Captain Mason led out marched out to search for the Indians, and were very nearly surprised.  One of Mason's men, Thomas Glen(sic), spotted an Indian and shot him, prompting the Indians to open fire.  Seeing that they were very nearly surrounded, Mason and his men retreated, with Mason suffering severe enough injuries that he was forced to hide by the path rather than go to the fort.  When Ogle led some men out to assist, his party was also attacked, and he was forced to take cover.  Both he and Mason were eventually able to reenter the fort. 

The Native American force subsequently burned the surrounding cabins and destroyed livestock. Major Samuel McColloch led a small force of men from Fort Vanmetre along Short Creek to assist the besieged Fort Henry. McColloch was separated from his men and was chased by attacking Indians. Upon his horse, McColloch charged up Wheeling Hill and made what is known as McColloch's Leap,  down its eastern side to safety. The Indians rushed to the edge, expecting to see the Major lying dead in a crumpled heap at the bottom of the hill. To their great surprise they instead saw McColloch, still mounted on his white horse, galloping away from them. The Indians remained overnight outside the fort, dancing and demonstrating, but never attacked it directly. They left the next morning, having suffered nine wounded and one killed, while the Americans lost fifteen, with five wounded. Following the Revolutionary War, Captain Samuel Mason would later turn to a life of crime as a river pirate in 1797 at Cave-In-Rock on the Ohio River and a highwayman on the Natchez Trace.

References

Fort Henry 1777
Conflicts in 1777
1777 in the United States
Fort Henry 1777
Wheeling, West Virginia
Fort Henry (1777)
Fort Henry (1777)